Patrick Doyle (born 1953) is a Scottish composer.

Patrick Doyle may also refer to:
Patrick Doyle (businessman) (1777–1857), delegate to the Newfoundland House of Assembly
Patrick Doyle (Irish republican) (1892–1921), IRA member
Patrick Doyle (Irish politician) (died 1964), Irish Fine Gael Senator
J. Patrick Doyle (born 1963), CEO of Domino's Pizza
Patrick Doyle (Nigerian actor) Nigerian veteran actor